Tonjong Baru Station (TOJB) is a class III railway station located in Tonjong, Kramatwatu, Serang Regency, Banten. The station, which is located at an altitude of +4 m, is included in the Operation Area I Jakarta. This station has three railway tracks with track 2 being a straight line.

At this station there is a container terminal and this station will also be the starting point for the construction of the Logistics Railway to the Port of Bojonegara. However, the construction of the rail to the port is still hampered due to unfinished land acquisition and is planned to be made as a starting point for the transportation of livestock.

Services
The following is a list of train services at the Tonjong Baru Station.

Passenger Services
 KAI Commuter

References

External links

Serang Regency
Railway stations in Banten
Railway stations opened in 1900